Tony Veland (born March 11, 1973) is a former American football Defensive Back for the Denver Broncos and the Carolina Panthers of the National Football League.

Veland was a member of the 1994 and 1995 Nebraska National championship teams.  The Broncos selected Veland in the sixth round of the 1996 draft. Veland won a ring as a member of the Denver Broncos Super Bowl XXXII championship team in 1997 over the Green Bay Packers and ended his playing career in 1998 with the Carolina Panthers. Veland went on to become the Defensive Coordinator of the Omaha Beef of United Indoor Football. He spent six seasons coaching the Beef.

He was shot on the night of June 13, 2011 as he sat in his vehicle and was admitted to Creighton University Medical Center.

References

External links
Stats from Pro Football Reference
Omaha Beef Page
Lincoln Journal-Star Article on Veland
Shooting incident in Omaha

1973 births
Living people
Sportspeople from Omaha, Nebraska
Nebraska Cornhuskers football players
Denver Broncos players
Carolina Panthers players
Omaha Beef players
American football defensive backs
Players of American football from Nebraska